Christophe Rochus (born 15 December 1978) is a retired professional male tennis player from Belgium.

Rochus is the older brother of Olivier Rochus. He reached the semi-finals of the Hamburg Masters in 2005 and was runner-up in two ATP tournaments, Valencia and Rotterdam. Rochus' career-high singles ranking was world No. 38, achieved in May 2006.

ATP career finals

Singles: 2 (2 runner-ups)

Doubles: 3 (1 title, 2 runner-ups)

Performance timelines

Singles

Doubles

ATP Challenger and ITF Futures finals

Singles: 16 (6–10)

Doubles: 7 (3–4)

External links

 
 
 

1978 births
Living people
Belgian male tennis players
Sportspeople from Namur (city)
21st-century Belgian people